Hitoshi (written: , , , , , , , , ,  or  in hiragana) is a masculine Japanese given name. Notable people with the name include:

, Japanese politician
, Japanese manga artist
, Japanese baseball player
, Japanese photographer
, Japanese baseball player
, Japanese politician
, Japanese scholar and murder victim
, Japanese painter
, Japanese general
, Japanese boxer
, Japanese manga artist
, Japanese geneticist
, Japanese politician
, Japanese basketball player
, Japanese comedian
, Japanese footballer
, Japanese footballer
, Japanese politician
, Japanese ice hockey player
, Japanese footballer and manager
, Japanese director
Hitoshi Narita, Japanese naval architect
, Japanese racing driver
, Japanese musician
, Japanese manga artist
, Japanese rugby union player
, Japanese judoka
, Japanese video game composer
Hitoshi Sasaki (disambiguation), multiple people
, Japanese footballer
, Japanese judoka
, Japanese voice actor
, Japanese baseball player
, Japanese boxer
, Japanese sumo wrestler
, Japanese footballer
, Japanese manga artist
, Japanese photographer
, Japanese actor, singer, comedian and musician
, Japanese short track speed skater
, Japanese footballer
, Japanese socialist

Fictional Characters
, a character from My Hero Academia

See also
11317 Hitoshi, a main-belt asteroid

Japanese masculine given names